WR 9 is a spectroscopic binary in the constellation Puppis consisting of a Wolf-Rayet star and a class O star. It is around 12,000 light years away.

WR 9 is a binary with two components in a circular 14-day orbit. The Wolf-Rayet component is often identified as the primary because it dominates the spectrum with its broad emission lines, although it is less massive, less luminous, and less visually bright than its companion. The companion is an approximately O7 star.

The spectrum is dominated by broad emission lines, those of CIV being the strongest, followed by HeII. CIII lines are seen but much weaker. OV lines are also stronger than CIII. The classification is usually given as WC4, although it has previously been assigned as WC5. By comparison, the absorption lines of the secondary star are narrower and weaker, although at blue and shorter wavelengths they become stronger than the WR lines. The spectral type of the secondary can be set at O7. The luminosity class cannot be determined clearly, although it has been suggested to be a supergiant. The Wolf-Rayet star shows no hydrogen in its spectrum and is thought to be hydrogen-free. It is calculated to consist of 42% helium and 58% heavier elements, mostly carbon and oxygen.

WR 9 is listed as an eclipsing binary in the General Catalogue of Variable Stars, as well as having the more irregular brightness changes frequently seen in Wolf Rayet stars. The total amplitude is only 0.04 magnitudes. The eclipses are so shallow because only the atmosphere of the WR star eclipses the O star on each orbit.

References

Puppis
Wolf–Rayet stars
Durchmusterung objects
063099
Spectroscopic binaries
Puppis, V443
037876
O-type stars